was a professional wrestling event promoted by World Wonder Ring Stardom. The event took place on December 29, 2022, in Tokyo at the Ryōgoku Kokugikan with limited attendance due in part to the ongoing COVID-19 pandemic at the time. It was also the last major pay-per-view hosted by Stardom in 2022.

Background
The show featured ten professional wrestling matches that resulted from scripted storylines, where wrestlers portrayed villains, heroes, or less distinguishable characters in the scripted events that built tension and culminated in a wrestling match or series of matches. The event's press conference took place on December 6, 2022, and was broadcast live on Stardom's YouTube channel.

Event
The preshow match was broadcast live on Stardom's YouTube channel. AZM retained the High Speed Championship against Hikari Shimizu, securing the ninth defense in a row and equalling the previous consecutive defenses record established by Mayu Iwatani. The first match of the main card saw an internal stable clash between the teams of Saya Iida, Hazuki and Koguma, and Mayu Iwatani, Momo Kohgo and Hanan which ended with the victory of the latter team with no further consequences in the process. In the third match, Mina Shirakawa returned from the broken jaw injury she sustained on November 3 at Stardom Gold Rush. While coming down the idle, she was accompanied by Xia Brookside and Mariah May. Shirakawa and Sayaka won the match, and after the bout concluded, Shirakawa turned on Sayaka, ending their "Pink Kabuki" tag team tenure. However, Shirakawa later explained that she would remain part of Cosmic Angels, and announced that together with Brookside and May she will form the brand new "Club Venus" faction as a sub-unit. They also announced themselves as the mystery trio of Stardom Triangle Derby 2023. The fourth match saw MaiHime (Maika and Himeka) earn a future shot to the Goddess of Stardom Championship after defeating the teams of Mirai and Ami Sourei, and Ruaka and Natsuko Tora. The fifth match saw IWGP Women's Champion Kairi and Queen's Quest leader Utami Hayashishita clash into a fifteen minute time limit draw. Next, Prominence's freelancer team of Risa Sera, Suzu Suzuki and Hiragi Kurumi defeated Oedo Tai's Momo Watanabe, Starlight Kid and Saki Kashima to capture the Artist of Stardom Championship. Next, Neo Stardom Army's sub tag team of 7Upp (Nane Takahashi and Yuu) defeated Tam Nakano and Natsupoi to win the Goddess of Stardom Championship by exerciting their right after winning the 2022 Goddesses of Stardom Tag League. In the semi main event, Saya Kamitani secured her twelfth consecutive defense of the Wonder of Stardom Championship against World Woman Pro-Wrestling Diana's Haruka Umesaki. Kamitani issued an open challenge which was responded by Mina Shirakawa and Future of Stardom Champion Ami Sourei.

In the main event, Giulia who became number one contender for the World of Stardom Championship after winning the Stardom 5 Star Grand Prix 2022 succeeded in dethroning the "red belt" holder Syuri, ending the latter's reign at 365 days.

Results

Notes

References

External links
Page Stardom World

2022 in professional wrestling
2022 in Tokyo
World Wonder Ring Stardom shows
Women's professional wrestling shows
Professional wrestling in Tokyo
World Wonder Ring Stardom